"Calcutta" is a German pop song. An instrumental version by American bandleader and TV host Lawrence Welk on the 1961 Dot Records album Calcutta! was a Number One song in the United States, and the most successful hit of Welk's career.

History

The tune was written in 1958 by the composer Heino Gaze. The original title was "Tivoli Melody", but it was re-titled several times, until it finally was named for the Indian city of Kolkata, known in German as Kalkutta and in English as Calcutta. The German version has lyrics by Hans Bradtke, and is titled "Kalkutta liegt am Ganges" (Calcutta lies on the Ganges). In the English-speaking world, the song was released under the title "Calcutta", and the American songwriting team of Paul Vance and Lee Pockriss wrote English lyrics, celebrating the charms of the "ladies of Calcutta."

Welk's recording of the tune was something of a departure for him. It incorporated his recognizable "trademarks," i.e., the harpsichord lead and an accordion but combined them with handclaps and a brisk rock rhythm.

"Calcutta" stayed atop the US pop chart for two weeks while the album, with its combination of easy listening tunes and covers of then-popular rock singles, charted at #1 for two weeks, spending three months on the chart. At the time "Calcutta" reached #1, Welk, who was 57, became the oldest artist to have a number one pop single in the U.S. (His record would be broken three years later by Louis Armstrong who at age 63 topped the singles charts with "Hello, Dolly!" in early 1964.) "Calcutta" was also a hit on the Hot R&B Sides chart, where it peaked at #10.  It proved to be the last charting hit of Welk's career.

Dancers Bobby Burgess and Barbara Boylan, cast members on Welk's weekly TV show, worked up a dance routine to go along with "Calcutta", which they performed numerous times on the Welk show over the years.

Apollo 10 1⁄2: A Space Age Childhood, a 2022 film, briefly used the song in the background of a scenes.

Chart performance

All-time charts

Cover versions
The Four Preps released a 45rpm single vocal version shortly after Welk's recording in 1961, Capitol Records 4508. It briefly entered the Billboard Hot 100.

Al Caiola released a version on his 1961 album Golden Hit Instrumentals, UAS 6142.

The Ventures released a version on their 1963 Dolton album The Ventures Play Telstar and the Lonely Bull, BST 8019.

Les Baxter made a version of the song, which was featured in Volume 3: Space Capades on the 1960s CD compilation Ultra-Lounge.

There is also a vocal version by Marino Marini, and a French-language cover by Petula Clark, Ma Fête À Moi.

There are German versions by Vico Torriani, Die Travellers, and Rainhard Fendrich.

See also
List of Hot 100 number-one singles of 1961 (U.S.)

References

External links
Summary of Calcutta at mp3.com

1960 singles
Billboard Hot 100 number-one singles
Cashbox number-one singles
Number-one singles in New Zealand
Pop instrumentals
1960s instrumentals
Dot Records singles
1958 songs